Rassa is a comune (municipality) in the Province of Vercelli in the Italian region Piedmont, located about  northeast of Turin and about  northwest of Vercelli, located in the upper Valsesia.

The Punta Tre Vescovi is located in its territory.

References

External links
  Official website

Cities and towns in Piedmont